The Mid-State 6 Conference was a high school athletics conference in central Illinois, made up of the high schools in Peoria, Illinois plus various other schools over the course of its existence.  It existed for several decades. Previous names included MidState 8 and MidState 9 in the 1960s, and Mid-State 10 in the 1980s and 1990s.

, the only schools remaining were in the city of Peoria: Peoria Notre Dame and the three general public high schools Manual, Peoria (Central), and Richwoods.  Those schools were joined the Big 12 Conference in 2014.

History

After IVC High School and Quincy Notre Dame left the Mid-State 6, a merger with the Western Big 6 Conference was set to begin in 2013 with football.  However, when Manual's prior obligation to play Eureka made it unable to schedule a game with Moline High School, the merger failed, with the Mid-State 6 schools instead playing officially as independents against Western Big 6 Conference schools in football during the 2013–2014 school year.

Past members

 Academy of Our Lady/Spalding Institute — name defunct in 1988 upon creation of Peoria Notre Dame High School
 Bergan High School — name defunct in 1988 when succeeded by Peoria Notre Dame High School
 Illinois Valley Central High School (football only) until 2013
 E. N. Woodruff High School — closed as a traditional high school in 2010; had always been in the same conference as other Peoria public schools
 Quincy Notre Dame High School until 2013

See also
 Mid-Illini Conference — the conference of schools surrounding, but not in, Peoria

 Canton High School
 Dunlap High School
 East Peoria Community High School
 Limestone Community High School
 Metamora Township High School
 Morton High School
 Pekin High School
 Washington Community High School

References

External links

Education in Peoria, Illinois
Illinois high school sports conferences
Sports in Peoria, Illinois